Wiele may refer to the following places in Poland:

Wiele, Kuyavian-Pomeranian Voivodeship
Wiele, Pomeranian Voivodeship

See also
Van de Wiele